Ocyale pilosa, is a species of spider of the genus Ocyale. It is a cosmopolitan species found from areas located between West Africa to Myanmar.

See also
 List of Lycosidae species

References

Lycosidae
Invertebrates of West Africa
Spiders of Africa
Spiders of Asia
Spiders described in 1960